Holler is a surname. Notable people with the surname include:

 Kjell Holler (1925–2000), Norwegian politician
 Liesel Holler (born 1980), Peruvian doctor, model, and beauty pageant titleholder
 Monica Holler (born 1984), Swedish professional cyclist

English toponymic surnames